The 1946 Copa de Competencia Británica Final was the match that decided the winner of the 3rd edition of this Argentine domestic cup. The game was played on December 14, 1946. Boca Juniors defeated San Lorenzo de Almagro 3–1 at Estadio Monumental, a neutral venue for the match.

Qualified teams

Overview 
The cup was contested by clubs participating in the 1946 Argentine Primera División season, playing a round of 16 in neutral venues. Boca Juniors beat Vélez at Independiente Stadium, qualifying to the quarterfinals. After eliminating Rosario Central (4–1) and River Plate (2–0), Boca reached the final of the competition, held at River Plate Stadium.

With goals by Gregorio Pin (2) and José Antonio Vázquez, Boca beat San Lorenzo, finally taking the title after losing in the finals two years consecutively to Huracán and Racing, respectively. Boca Juniors also managed to win the tournament without losing a game.

Match details

References

b
b
1946 in Argentine football
Football in Buenos Aires